Obi divination is a system of divination used in the traditional Yoruba religion and in Yoruba-derived Afro-American religions. In Yorubaland, it uses palm or kola nuts; in Latin America and the Caribbean it uses four pieces of coconut.

References

Divination
Objects used for divination
Afro-American religion
Yoruba mythology
Yoruba words and phrases
Santería